Bickerstaffe is a civil parish in the West Lancashire district of Lancashire, England.  It contains twelve listed buildings that are recorded in the National Heritage List for England.  All of the listed buildings are designated at Grade II, the lowest of the three grades, which is applied to "buildings of national importance and special interest".  The parish contains the village of Bickerstaffe and the hamlet of Barrow Nook, and is otherwise rural.  The listed buildings include houses, farmhouses and farm buildings, a church, structures associated with the Friends' Burial Ground, a converted windmill, a boundary stone, stocks, and a war memorial.


Buildings

References

Citations

Sources

Lists of listed buildings in Lancashire
Buildings and structures in the Borough of West Lancashire